People's Plan Campaign, held in 1996 in Kerala State, was an experiment in decentralization of powers to local governments with focus on local planning. Kerala State lies in the south-west part of India. In India's Ninth Five-Year Plan, each state within the national federation was expected to draw up its own annual plan and the People's Plan was an offshoot of it.

In the beginning of the ninth plan, the Government of Kerala took a bold decision to devolve 35 percent of the state development budget down from a centralized bureaucracy to local governments where local people could determine and implement their own development priorities. This was implemented through the People's Plan Campaign (PPC) under the joint supervision of the Department of Local Self-Government and State Planning Board.

New Government in power
In 1996 on assuming power, the ruling Left Democratic Front (LDF) took the agenda of decentralization as the first priority item.

Outcome
Studies on the performance of the people's planning and decentralization tend to show a mixed trend: it is not a resounding success but also not an utter failure. There were several issues that hampered the plan from the start and these included "weak and highly centralised administrative setup and inadequacy in administrative procedure, lack of experience, and inadequate database." These challenges often prevent the state government to pass the financial and management functions to the local level.  

However, recent developments start to demonstrate efficiencies once administrative controls are eliminated. This is attributed to the elimination of the opportunity for administrative corruption as well as the increased transparency due to the involvement of several people at several levels of the decision-making process.

See also
 District Planning in Kerala
 Local Governance in Kerala
 Nava Kerala Mission

References

External links
 Five years of Participatory planning in Kerala : Reality or rhetoric by Jos Chathukulam and M S John
 Local Democracy and Development : Keralas People’s Campaign for Decentralised Planning by Dr Thomas Isaac & Reichard W Franke
 Campaign for Democratic Decentralisation in Kerala : An Assessment from the perspective of Empowered Deliberative Democracy by Dr T M Thomas Isaac
Moving the State: The Politics of Democratic Decentralization in Kerala, South Africa, and Porto Alegre  by Dr Patrick Heller.
 Democratic Decentralisation and the Planning Principle: The Transition from Below by C P Chandra Sekhar
 Kerala Peoples Plan Revisited by Gilbert Sebastian. Mainstream XLVI 2008
 A left Agenda for Kerala
 Dr M A Oommen Committee Report on Decentalised Planning and Development, Government of Kerala, April 2009

Local government in Kerala
Economic planning in India